Hyvinkää is a town and municipality in Finland.

Hyvinkää or Hyvinkään may also refer to:

Hyvinkää Church
Hyvinkää Airfield
Hyvinkää railway station
Hanko–Hyvinkää railway
Hyvinkää shooting
Hyvinkään Palloseura, a football club 
Hyvinkään Tahko, a sports club